Bob Ellis Mersereau is a Canadian arts journalist.

He is a music columnist and longtime arts reporter for CBC Television in New Brunswick. Since 1982, he has been a reporter on the East Coast music scene for CBC Radio, CBC Television, and the Telegraph-Journal. Nicknamed Rockin' Bob by Peter Gzowski, Mersereau was a frequent guest on CBC programs such as Morningside and Sounds Like Canada.

Mersereau is the author of the 2007 book The Top 100 Canadian Albums and the 2010 book The Top 100 Canadian Singles.

References 

Canadian radio personalities
Canadian television personalities
Canadian writers about music
Living people
Writers from New Brunswick
Year of birth missing (living people)